Steve Houanard (born 2 April 1986) is a professional French road cyclist, who last rode for the  team.

Career
In 2011, Houanard participated in his first Grand Tour, the Vuelta a España and finished 133rd. His best result in 2012 was a 22nd placing at the Grand Prix Cycliste de Québec.

Doping
During an off-competition doping test performed on 21 September 2012, Houanard tested positive for EPO and was provisionally suspended by the UCI. His sports director, Vincent Lavenu, was reportedly "saddened and angered" by that finding. Houanard accepted a two-year ban on 18 January 2013.

Major results

2008
 3rd Overall Tour Alsace
 6th Grand Prix Cristal Energie
2009
 10th Overall Driedaagse van West-Vlaanderen

References

External links

Steve Houanard profile at Ag2r-La Mondiale

1986 births
Doping cases in cycling
Living people
French male cyclists
French sportspeople in doping cases
Cyclists from Paris